Grand National Night is a 1945 thriller play by the British writers Campbell Christie and Dorothy Christie. A racehorse owner quarrels and accidentally kills his wife on the evening of the Grand National.

It premiered at the New Theatre, Oxford before transferring to the Apollo Theatre in London's West End where it ran for 268 performances between 12 June 1946 and 1 February 1947. The original West End cast included Leslie Banks, Hermione Baddeley, Frederick Lloyd, Olga Edwardes, Campbell Copelin and Vincent Holman. It was revived briefly at the Theatre Royal Stratford East in 1948, lasting for 16 performances.

Film adaptation
In 1953 it was made into a British film of the same title starring Nigel Patrick, Moira Lister and Beatrice Campbell.

References

Bibliography
 Goble, Alan. The Complete Index to Literary Sources in Film. Walter de Gruyter, 1999.
 Wearing, J.P. The London Stage 1940-1949: A Calendar of Productions, Performers, and Personnel.  Rowman & Littlefield, 2014.

1945 plays
British plays adapted into films
Plays set in Liverpool
West End plays
Thriller plays